Shenaz Patel (born July 29, 1966) is a Mauritian writer.

Early life and education
She was born in the town of Rose Hill, Mauritius and writes in both French and Mauritian Creole. She did her secondary studies at Lycée La Bourdonnais. Subsequently, she obtained her degree in Modern Literature from the Université de la Réunion in 1986.

Career
Patel was one of a group of Mauritian writers who founded the literary journal Tracés. She has translated two Tintin stories into Creole: Le Secret de la Licorne and Trésor de Rackham le Rouge.

Her first play La phobie du caméléon was awarded the Prix Beaumarchais.

In 2014, Vents d'ailleurs published her novella Paradis Blues, which is written in French with Creole interspersed through the narration.

In 2016, she was a participant in the International Writing Program's Fall Residency at the University of Iowa, in Iowa City, IA.

Selected works

Novels 
 Le Portrait Chamarel (2002), received the Prix Radio France du Livre de l'Océan Indien
 Sensitive (2003), received the Prix du Roman Francophone
 Le Silence des Chagos (2005), received the Prix Soroptimist de la Romancière francophone 
 Paradis Blues (2014)

Stories 
 "À l'encre d'un nom" in Au tour des Femmes (1995)
 "Ille était une fois" in Maurice, demain et après (1996)
 "Do-do, l'enfant" in Histoires d'enfants (1999)
 "Marée noire" in Nocturnes (2000)
 "Zistwar mistran" in Nouvelles de l'étrange (2001), Creole
 "Nous avons pris des bateaux" and "Anvolé" (Creole) in Voyages (2002)
 "Désir de mer" and "Lamer inn fermé" (Creole) in En mer (2004)
 "Incroyable, dites-vous" and "Si ziraf pa kapav anvalé" (Creole) in Histoires incroyables (2007)
 "Zistwar sosouri" in Zistwar zanimo (2010), Creole
 "L'envers du ciel" in De l'autre côté du ciel (2011)

Plays 
 Esper Godo, a translation into Mauritian Creole of Samuel Beckett's Waiting for Godot
 La Phobie du Caméléon, 2005

Literary Awards and distinctions
Patel has been awarded the following honours:

References 

1966 births
Living people
Mauritian novelists
Mauritian translators
Translators to Mauritian Creole
Mauritian dramatists and playwrights
Mauritian women writers
Mauritian women novelists
Mauritian women short story writers
Women dramatists and playwrights
21st-century Mauritian writers
21st-century women writers
Mauritian people of Indian descent
Mauritian people of Gujarati descent